Millville is the name of two populated places in the US state of Alabama:

 Millville, Lamar County, Alabama
 Millville, Sumter County, Alabama